Venezuela uses the UTC−04:00 time offset, and they had previously used UTC−04:30 from 9 December 2007 until 30 April 2016. The time is commonly called Venezuelan Standard Time (VET), and legally referred to as Hora Legal de Venezuela (HLV) or Venezuela's Legal Time. The HLV is administered by the Navigation and Hydrography Service, in the Cagigal Naval Observatory, Caracas.

The official time zone of Venezuela is determined by meridian 60° west of Greenwich, UK.

UTC−04:30 was formerly the official time zone in Venezuela from 1912 to 1965, when the government changed it in order to adopt meridian 60° UTC−04:00, which passes through Punta de Playa, Delta Amacuro State. It was changed again to UTC−04:30 from 2007 to 2016.

Background
The Venezuela's Legal Time Service was founded in answer to the need of a standard time across the country, located approximately between meridians 60° W and 75° W, corresponding to UTC−04:00 and UTC−05:00 with respect to the prime meridian. In 1912, the meridian 67° 30' W was adopted as the first geographical reference for a national time system. The HLV was given to the National Telegraphy Central Office as an astronomical time standard, corresponding to GMT−04:30. During the 1930s, the broadcasting services began time reports synchronized with the HLV. In 1965 the Republic of Venezuela Congress established meridian 60° W, near Punta de Playa in Delta Amacuro state, as official, since the previous one did not fulfill the international requirement for time standards of being based on integer differences with the GMT. Beginning then, Venezuela Standard Time was UTC−04:00; this meant the addition of thirty more minutes to the previous time. This modification was carried out based on research from the La Electricidad de Caracas (Caracas Electricity) Company. The results indicated that adding thirty minutes to the previous time would save energy use, since all morning activities were going to be carried out in the presence of sunlight, and there would be an additional half an hour of sunlight in the afternoons.

Current standard time
In December 2007, Hugo Chávez changed, via decree, the official meridian to meridian 67° 30' W, the same used between 1912 and 1965. As result, the standard time was UTC−04:30, half an hour behind the previous time which eventually led to an increase in energy consumption.

On 15 April 2016, President Nicolás Maduro announced that Venezuela would reverse Chávez's time change due to the shortage of electricity (the country's hydroelectric power has been hit by low water levels) in Venezuela, with a return to UTC−04:00 which began on 1 May 2016 at 03:00:00.

IANA time zone database
The IANA time zone database contains one zone for Venezuela in the file zone.tab, named America/Caracas.

References

External links
 Current local time in Caracas
 BBC News: Venezuela creates own time zone
 Clocks to be set back 30 minutes on 2007-12-09 Timeanddate.com
 New Time Zone Should Complement Territorial Reorganization Bill. Mathaba, 2007-09-22